Hampton Glacier is a glacier lying between Mount Hahn and Mount Nicholas in the northeast part of Alexander Island, Antarctica.

The glacier was first photographed from the air during a flight up it in 1937 by the British Graham Land Expedition (BGLE). Its mouth was surveyed in 1948 by the Falkland Islands Dependencies Survey and later named for Wilfred E. Hampton of the BGLE, who piloted the airplane that made the above-mentioned flight.

See also
 List of glaciers in the Antarctic
 Sullivan Glacier
 Sibelius Glacier
 Asafiev Glacier

References

Glaciers of Alexander Island